Aycock is a surname. Notable people with the surname include:

 Alice Aycock (born 1946), American sculptor
 Angela Aycock (born 1973), American basketball player
 Charles Brantley Aycock (1859–1912), American politician
 Cora Lily Woodard Aycock (1868–1952), American political hostess
 Dale Aycock (born 1935), American author
 Dugan Aycock (1908–2001), American golfer
 Jimmie Don Aycock (born 1946), American politician
 Roger D. Aycock (1914–2004), American author
 Shane Aycock (born 1974), American Sailor & Soldier       (OEF & OIF)
 Sharion Aycock (born 1955), American judge
 Taddy Aycock (1915–1987), American politician
 William Brantley Aycock (1915–2015), American educator

See also
 Aycock, Greensboro, North Carolina, neighbourhood
 Aycock House